Frances Matthew Jones Hunt was an American progressive era politician who is best known for being the first woman elected to a seat in the Arkansas General Assembly. In 1922, Hunt was elected to a seat in the Arkansas House of Representatives.

References

Members of the Arkansas House of Representatives
Women state legislators in Arkansas
20th-century American politicians
20th-century American women politicians